Rohilkhand (today Bareilly, Moradabad and Rampur) is a  Muslim-dominated region in the northwestern part of Uttar Pradesh, India, that is centered on the Bareilly and Moradabad divisions. It is part of the upper Ganges Plain, and is named after the Rohilla tribe.  The region was called Madhyadesh and Panchala in the Sanskrit epics Mahabharata and Ramayana.

Etymology
Rohilkhand means "the land of the Rohilla". The term Rohilla first became common in the 17th century, with Rohilla used to refer to the people coming from the land of Roh, which was originally a geographical term that corresponded with the territory from Swat and Bajaur in the north to Sibi in the south, and from Hasan Abdal (Attock) in the east to Kabul and Kandahar in the west. A majority of the Rohillas migrated from Pashtunistan to North India between the 17th and 18th centuries.

Geography 

The Ganges Doab to the south and west, Kumaon to the north, Nepal to the east, and the Awadh region to the southeast mark its borders.

History 
The Rohilla Afghan leader Daud Khan led the settlement in the Katehar region in northern India under orders of the Mogul emperor Aurangzeb (ruled 1658–1707) to suppress the Katheria Rajput uprisings. Rohilla Rajput's first king was Raja Ram Singh Katheria. These Rohilla Rajputs contained 18 clans of Rajput Vansh, including the Chauhan, Rathore, Gehlot, Sisodia, Nikumbh, and Pundir. Originally, some 20,000 soldiers from various Pashtun tribes (Yusafzai, Ghori, Osmani, Ghilzai, Barech, Marwat, Tareen, Kakar, Naghar, Afridi and Khattak) were hired as soldiers by the Mughals. Aurangzeb was impressed with their performance and an additional force of 25,000 Pashtuns was recruited from modern Khyber Pakhtunkhwa and Afghanistan and were given respected positions in the Mogul Army. Most Pashtuns settled in the Katehar region and brought their families from Khyber Pakhtunkhwa and Afghanistan. During Nadir Shah's invasion of northern India in 1739, led by the general Ahmed Shah Abdali, a new wave of Pashtuns increased the population to over 1,000,000. Due to the large settlement of Rohilla Afghans, the Katehar region became known as Rohilkhand. Bareilly was made the capital of the Rohilkhand state and it became Pashtun majority city with Gali Nawaban as the main royal street. Other important cities were Moradabad, Rampur, Shahjahanpur, and Badaun.

In 1752, the Maratha were asked by Safdarjung, the Nawab of Oudh, to help him defeat Pashtun Rohilla. The Maratha forces and Awadh forces besieged the Rohillas, who had sought refuge in Kumaon but had to retreat when Ahmad Shah Abdali invaded India.

After the Third Battle of Panipat, thousands of Pashtun and Baloch soldiers settled in northern India. These diverse ethnic, cultural, and linguistic groups merged over time to form the Urdu-speaking Muslims of South Asia.

In 1772, Marathas defeated Rohilla chieftain Zabita Khan. They destroyed the Rohilla tribal chief Najib-ul-Daula's grave, scattering his bones. In 1772–73, Mahadji captured Najibabad. After plundering Rohillakhand, the Maratha advanced on Oudh. Foreseeing the same fate as Rohilla, Safdarjung made frantic calls to British troops in Bengal.

The Viceroy of British India dispatched 20,000 British troops to free Rohillakhand from the Maratha Empire and give it to Safdarjung. The Maratha and British armies fought in Ram Ghat, but the sudden demise of the Peshwa and the civil war in Pune to choose the next Peshwa forced the Maratha to retreat. Rohilla decided not to pay, absent a war between the two states. The British made Oudh a buffer state in order to protect it from the Maratha, and protected Oudh. The subsidy of one British brigade to provide protection to Safdarjung and Oudh from Maratha was Rs 2,10,000.

Rohilkhand was under the rule of Rohillas with their capital in Bareilly until the First Rohilla War. The Rohillas were defeated and driven from Bareilly by Safdarjung and EEIC troops, and the state of Rampur was established under Safdarjung. In 1803, the British annexed Rohilkhand in Upper Doab.

Rulers

Notes

References

See also 

 Sarai Rohilla Railway Station
 Jewan
Khutar
Pawayan

 
Historical Indian regions
Rohilla
Pashtun diaspora in India